Günay Güvenç (born 25 June 1991) is a Turkish professional footballer who plays as a goalkeeper for Gaziantep F.K.

Honours
Beşiktaş
Süper Lig: 2015–16

References

External links
 
 
 
 

1991 births
Living people
People from Neu-Ulm
Sportspeople from Swabia (Bavaria)
Turkish footballers
Turkey B international footballers
German footballers
German people of Turkish descent
Stuttgarter Kickers II players
Stuttgarter Kickers players
3. Liga players
Beşiktaş J.K. footballers
Association football goalkeepers
Adanaspor footballers
TFF First League players
Süper Lig players
Footballers from Bavaria